The Old World is term used to distinguish the parts of Africa, Europe, and Asia, or Afro-Eurasia, known to the inhabitants before contact with the Americas.

Old World may also refer to:

 Old World (Warhammer)
 Old World ROM
 Old World (video game), a strategy video game by Mohawk Games
 World order (also Old World Order), the current operating system of the world as opposed to the New World Order conspiracy theory.

See also
 World (disambiguation)
 New World (disambiguation)